Joachim Gregory Nicholas Pogose (known as Nicky Pogose; died ) was an Armenian merchant and a zamindar. He belonged to the Armenian community of Dhaka.

Career
Pogose studied in Dhaka Collegiate School and Dhaka College.

On 12 June 1848, Pogose founded the Pogose Anglo Vernacular School (later Pogose School), the first private school in Dhaka. He served as its headmaster until 1855. He served as the one of the nine commissioners of Dacca Municipality during 1874–75. He was a partner of the Dacca Bank.

Pogose built the Weis House which is currently the headquarters of Bulbul Lalitakala Academy. By 1868, Pogose became one of five Armenian zamindars in Dhaka.

Pogose died in 1876 and he was buried at the Christian Cemetery in the Narinda suburb of Dhaka. His epitaph reads"Till the day break and Shadows flee away".

Family
Pogose was married to Mariam Avdall (b. 1825/26). She was a daughter of Johannes Avdall, the then headmaster of the Armenian College and Philanthropic Academy in Kolkata. Together they had at least 10 children including Gregory Joachim Pogose (b. 1845/46), John Pogose (b. 1850/51), Nicholas Joachim Pogose (1852–1872) and Paul Pogose (b. 1853/54).

References

1870 deaths
19th-century Armenian people
Indian people of Armenian descent
Bangladeshi people of Armenian descent
Dhaka College alumni